Rostam Kandi (also Romanized as Rostam Kandī) is a village in Abish Ahmad Rural District, Abish Ahmad District, Kaleybar County, East Azerbaijan Province, Iran. At the 2006 census, its population was 53, in 12 families.

References 

Populated places in Kaleybar County